Caribe is a 1987 Canadian adventure-thriller film directed  by Michael Kennedy and starring John Savage, Kara Glover and  Stephen McHattie.

Plot

Cast

References

External links 

1980s adventure thriller films
Canadian adventure thriller films
English-language Canadian films
Films scored by Mychael Danna
Films directed by Michael Kennedy (director)
1980s English-language films
1980s Canadian films